Mordellistena tosta is a species of beetle in the genus Mordellistena of the family Mordellidae. It was described by John Lawrence LeConte in 1862.

References

Beetles described in 1862
tosta